The Longwood trolleybus turntable formed part of the Huddersfield trolleybus system, which served the market town of Huddersfield, in West Yorkshire, England.

History

Manually operated, the turntable remained in use only until 1940.  By that time, wartime conditions had led to the recruitment of female conductresses who were not strong enough to help the driver operate the turntable, and blackout regulations had made it difficult for crew to see what they were doing after dark. The turntable was therefore replaced by alternative arrangements, and was not put back into service after the end of the war.  However, it remained in situ for many years, until finally being removed in the second half of the 1980s.

Significance
The Longwood turntable is said to be one of only four trolleybus turntables ever to have been constructed worldwide.  Two other such turntables are the similarly abandoned Christchurch trolleybus turntable, in Bournemouth, England (in operation 1936–1969; now a Grade II listed building), and the Unterburg trolleybus turntable in Solingen, Germany (still in use for heritage trolleybus services).  A fourth known trolleybus turntable was one used on the Guadalajara trolleybus system in Mexico in the 1980s, in a since-closed trolleybus-only tunnel in the city centre, on a temporary basis in 1982–1983 and again from 1985 until early 1988 (when the tunnel closed for the start of work to convert it for use by Guadalajara's light rail system).

See also

History of Huddersfield
Transport in Huddersfield

References

Notes

Further reading

External links
Flickr photo of bus 493 on turntable
photo of bus at turntable converted to reversing bay

Trolleybus Turntable
Trolleybus transport in the United Kingdom
Transport in Huddersfield